Clark Graebner (born November 4, 1943) is a retired American professional tennis player.

Early life
Graebner was born in Cleveland, Ohio, the only child of Paul Graebner, a doctor, and his wife, the former Janice Clark. Paul had been a moderately successful youth player. Clark won the state high-school tennis championship three times. He graduated from Northwestern University, where he joined the Delta Upsilon fraternity.

In 1964 he married rising American tennis player Carole Caldwell. They had two children, a daughter, Cameron, and a son, Clark. The couple separated in 1974 and eventually divorced. In 1975, Graebner married Patti Morgan. Caldwell died of cancer in New York City on November 19, 2008.

Tennis career
Graebner was considered to be one of the fastest servers in his time. In the 1967 United States Championship, the last time the event, today's U.S. Open, was open only to amateur players, Graebner lost in the final to John Newcombe. The following year he reached the semifinals in singles at both Wimbledon and the inaugural U.S. Open.

Graebner and Arthur Ashe led the U.S. Davis Cup team to victory in the 1968 Davis Cup, its first in five years. The Americans won four more titles in as many years. John McPhee's book, Levels of the Game, is about a semifinal match played between Graebner and Ashe at the 1968 U.S. Open at Forest Hills. Ashe won the match.

Graebner's most significant title was probably the men's doubles title at the 1966 French Championships, where he and Dennis Ralston beat Ion Ţiriac and Ilie Năstase in the final. He also won the 1968 U.S. Men's Clay Court singles Championship in Milwaukee, the 1969 and 1970 U.S. Men's Clay Court doubles Championship (with William Bowrey and Ashe, respectively), and the 1963 doubles title at Cincinnati.

Graebner also reached the singles quarterfinals in Cincinnati in 1970, falling to eventual champion Ken Rosewall.

Graebner ranks No. 32 on the list of best career set win–loss records in Grand Slam events, at 108-58, for a 65% record.

Grand Slam tournament performance timeline

Singles

Career finals

Singles: 11 (4 wins, 7 losses)

Doubles finals: 21 (10 wins, 11 losses)

See also

 Professional Tennis Championships

References

Further reading
 Clark Graebner, Carole Graebner, Mixed Doubles Tennis (McGraw-Hill, New York, 1973)

External links
 
 
 

1943 births
Living people
American male tennis players
French Championships (tennis) champions
Northwestern Wildcats men's tennis players
Sportspeople from Cleveland
Sportspeople from New York City
Tennis people from New York (state)
Tennis people from Ohio
Wimbledon junior champions
Grand Slam (tennis) champions in men's doubles
Grand Slam (tennis) champions in boys' singles
20th-century American people